Bert Brown (1938–2018) was a Canadian politician.

Bert Brown may also refer to:

Bert Brown (footballer), English footballer for York
Sailor Brown (1915–2008), English footballer for Charlton, Nottingham and Aston Villa, sometimes known as Bert

See also
Albert Brown (disambiguation)
Robert Brown (disambiguation)
Herbert Brown (disambiguation)
Hubert Brown (disambiguation)
Bertram Brown (disambiguation)
Bertie Brown, artist, see Freddie Adkins